Lise Charmel is a manufacturer and distributor of Lingerie in Lyon, France. As one of the largest producers of French Lingerie. Lise Charmel is known for French luxury lingerie.

References

External links 

 http://www.lisecharmel.com/collections.aspx

Clothing companies of France
Manufacturing companies based in Lyon
Undergarments